The 2005 Hyderabad Open was a Tier IV WTA Women's Tennis Tournament held in Hyderabad, Andhra Pradesh, India from 7–12 February 2005.

Hometown favourite Sania Mirza, a resident of Hyderabad, impressed the crowds at the tournament by becoming the first ever Indian woman to win a WTA Singles Title.

WTA entrants

Seeds

* Rankings as of 31 January 2005

Other entrants
The following players received wildcards into the singles main draw:
  Ankita Bhambri
  Sania Mirza
  Shahar Pe'er

The following players received entry from the qualifying draw:
  Akgul Amanmuradova
  Jarmila Gajdošová
  Li Ting
  Mandy Minella

The following players received entry through the Lucky loser spot:
  Shiho Hisamatsu
  Tatiana Poutchek

Champions
Singles

 Sania Mirza defeated  Alona Bondarenko, 6–4, 5–7, 6–3

Doubles

 Yan Zi /  Zheng Jie defeated  Li Ting /  Sun Tiantian, 6–4, 6–1

References

2005 WTA Tour
2005 in Indian tennis
Bangalore Open